Nagla Roran is a village in Karnal District, Haryana, India.

References

Villages in Karnal district